This is a list of notable people who are current or former residents or associates of the town of Slough in Berkshire.

Cecil Aldin (1870–1935), painter of animals and rural life
Gerry Anderson (1929–2012), television drama maker and creator of supermarionation
Stanley Baldwin (1867–1947), schoolboy at St Michael's School, Aldin House and later Prime Minister
Steve Bell (born 1951), political cartoonist
 Cliff Bennett (born 1940), of Cliff Bennett and the Rebel Rousers
Keith Bosley (born 1937), poet and translator
 Alan Bown (born 1942), of The Alan Bown Set
Fenner Brockway (1888–1988), anti-war activist and politician
Isambard Kingdom Brunel (1806–1859), engineer.
Mark Brzezicki (born 1957), drummer with Big Country, Procol Harum
Jimmy Carr (born 1972), comedian
Alma Cogan (1932–1966), singer, former pupil at St Joseph's School
Rod Evans (born 1947), original lead singer of Deep Purple
Sean Foley (born 1964), comedian
Thomas Gray (1716–1771), poet, classical scholar, and professor of history
Geri Halliwell (born 1972), entertainer
 Chip Hawkes, of The Tremeloes
Caroline Herschel (1750–1848), astronomer.
John Herschel (1792–1871), mathematician and astronomer.
William Herschel (1738–1822), astronomer and composer.
Alan Johnson (born 1950), former Slough postal worker and Cabinet minister
Simon Kernick (born 1967), author
Danny King (born 1969), author
Jayne Kitt (born 1970), Big Brother 7 contestant
Iain Lee (born 1973), entertainer
Spencer Livermore, Baron Livermore (born 1975), politician
Forrest Mars Sr. (1904–1999), entrepreneur
Marian McPartland OBE (1918–2013), jazz pianist
John Nash CBE, RA (1893–1977), painter
Gary Numan (born 1958), musician
Richard of Cornwall (1209–1272), royal aristocrat, Plantagenet.
Helen Sharman (born 1963), scientist and astronaut
Kalim Siddiqui (1931–1996), journalist and Muslim activist
Billy Smart, Jr (1934–2005), circus owner
Una Stubbs (1937–2021), actress.
Ellen Ternan (1839–1914), actress
Thousand Yard Stare (formed 1989), indie pop band
Tracey Ullman (born 1959), comedian
Robert Watson-Watt (1892–1973), scientist

Sport 
Mark McGuinness (born 2001), footballer
Matty Cash (born 1997), footballer
Billy Clifford (born 1882), footballer 
Kim Conley (born 1986), Olympic athlete
Tommy Farr (1913–1986), boxer
Sam Hutchinson (born 1989), footballer
Mark Hylton (born 1976), Olympic athlete
Fiona May (born 1969), twice world long jump champion
Grace Moloney (born 1993), Ireland international footballer
Lloyd Owusu (born 1976), Ghana international footballer
Marcia Richardson (born 1972), Olympic athlete
Mark Richardson (born 1972), Olympic athlete
Marcus Willis (born 1990), tennis player
Vic Woodley (1910–1978), footballer

References

 
Slough, Berkshire